Red Deers is the team of Hacettepe University American Football Society. It was established in 1993 in Ankara, Turkey. Known as Hacettepe Bullets in the year it was founded, the community later changed its name to Hacettepe Red Deers, inspired by the symbol of Hacettepe University. Turkey's second football team, Hacettepe Red Deers; In the year it was founded, it took its first step into its career as the champion in the league between Boğaziçi Sultans, ITU Hornets and Hacettepe Red Deers.

Honours 
 Türkiye Korumalı Futbol Ligi
 Champions: (2) 2007, 2008
 Runners-up: (1) 2012

References 

American football teams in Turkey
Sports teams in Ankara
Hacettepe University
American football teams established in 1993
1993 establishments in Turkey
Student sport in Turkey
Türkiye Korumalı Futbol Ligi teams
American football teams in Ankara